Argyresthia monochromella is a moth of the family Yponomeutidae first described by August Busck in 1921. It is found in Canada in British Columbia and Alberta.

The forewings are unicolored shining golden-yellowish fuscous with a slight greenish tint. The hindwings are light fuscous. Adults are on wing in June.

References

Moths described in 1921
Argyresthia
Moths of North America